Tall Pines is a historic home located at Cazenovia in Madison County, New York.  The main block of the house was built about 1835 and is a two-story, three-bay, rectangular, frame building in the Federal style.  A wing was added to it in stages during the 19th and early 20th centuries.  Also on the property is a guest house.

It was added to the National Register of Historic Places in 1987.

References

Houses on the National Register of Historic Places in New York (state)
Federal architecture in New York (state)
Houses completed in 1835
Houses in Madison County, New York
National Register of Historic Places in Cazenovia, New York